Frederick III, the Strict (Friedrich III. der Strenge; 14 December 1332, Dresden – 21 May 1381, Altenburg), Landgrave of Thuringia and Margrave of Meissen, was the son of Frederick II, Margrave of Meissen and Mathilde of Bavaria.

He took over the government for his brothers William, Balthasar and Ludwig (Bishop of Bamberg) after the death of their father in 1349. One year later the Emperor gave the Margraviate of Meissen to the four brothers jointly. In 1368 common government began, afterwards the brothers changed rulership every two years. In 1379 they divided their possessions.  After Frederick III's death, Meissen was divided between his three sons and Thuringia was inherited by his brothers; it later passed to his nephew Frederick IV, Landgrave of Thuringia, son of his brother Balthasar, and was ultimately inherited by Frederick the Strict's grandson, Frederick II, Elector of Saxony.

Family
Frederick was married to Catherine of Henneberg, heiress of Coburg, Neustadt, Sonneberg, Neuhaus, Rodach, etc. (died Coburg 15 July 1397), daughter of Count Heinrich IV of Henneberg. They had four sons:
Frederick (d. young 1350)
Frederick I, Elector of Saxony (11 April 1370 – 4 January 1428)
Wilhelm II, Margrave of Meissen (23 April 1371 – 30 March 1425)
Georg (1380 – 9 December 1401)

Notes

Ancestry

See also
List of margraves of Meissen
Wettin (dynasty)

Nobility from Dresden
Margraves of Meissen
Landgraves of Thuringia
Rulers of Thuringia
House of Wettin
1332 births
1381 deaths
Burials at Altzella Abbey